The 1952 season was the 41st season in Hajduk Split’s history and their 6th in the Yugoslav First League. Their 3rd place finish in the 1951 season meant it was their 6th successive season playing in the Yugoslav First League.

Competitions

Overall

Yugoslav First League

Classification

Preliminary stage (group 2)

Final Round (championship group)

Results summary

Results by round

Matches

Yugoslav First League

Sources: hajduk.hr

Player seasonal records

Top scorers

Source: Competitive matches

See also
1952 Yugoslav First League

External sources
 1952 Yugoslav First League at rsssf.com

HNK Hajduk Split seasons
Hajduk Split
Yugoslav football championship-winning seasons